The participation of Spain in the Junior Eurovision Song Contest first began at the inaugural Junior Eurovision Song Contest in  which took place in Copenhagen, Denmark. Televisión Española (TVE), a division of Radiotelevisión Española (RTVE) and member of the European Broadcasting Union (EBU), were responsible for the selection process of their participation. Spain used a national selection format, broadcasting a show entitled Eurojunior, for their participation at the contests. The first representative to participate for the nation at the 2003 contest was Sergio with the song "Desde el cielo", which finished in second place out of sixteen participating entries, achieving a score of 125 points.

History

Spain is one of the sixteen countries to have made their debut at the inaugural Junior Eurovision Song Contest 2003, which took place on 15 November 2003 at the Forum in Copenhagen, Denmark. Child singer Sergio was the first participant to represent Spain with the song "", which finished in second place out of sixteen participating entries, achieving a score of 137 points. Spain is one of the most successful countries in the contest, with its first six entrants all finishing in the top 5. Spanish broadcaster Televisión Española (TVE) did not return after the  contest, stating "the Junior Eurovision promotes stereotypes we do not share".

Since 2013, there were several attempts to manage the return of Spain to the contest. During the Eurovision Song Contest 2014 in Copenhagen, the head of the Spanish delegation, Federico Llano said that TVE was not planning to participate in the 2014 contest. In 2014, it was stated that European Broadcasting Union TV Committee would discuss the possibility of allowing commercial television channels to participate, in order to negotiate with Spanish private broadcasters to manage the return of Spain to the contest. These attempts did not come to fruition. In 2015, several media outlets reported that TVE was working on returning to the contest, but, these claims were not confirmed by the broadcaster.

On 28 September 2016, however, Spain was not listed as one of the seventeen participating countries in the contest. RTVE returned to the contest in  after a 13-year absence. Their success, however, could not be repeated by Levi Díaz, who placed 15th, the first time Spain had finished outside the top 10. In 2022, its representative Carlos Higes placed 6th, bringing Spain back to the top 10 for the first time since 2020.

Participation overview

Gallery

Commentators and spokespersons
The contests are broadcast online worldwide through the official Junior Eurovision Song Contest website junioreurovision.tv and YouTube. In 2015, the online broadcasts featured commentary in English by junioreurovision.tv editor Luke Fisher and 2011 Bulgarian Junior Eurovision Song Contest entrant Ivan Ivanov. The Spanish broadcaster, Televisión Española, sent their own commentators to the contest in order to provide commentary in the Spanish language. Spokespersons were also chosen by the national broadcaster in order to announce the awarding points from Spain. The table below list the details of each commentator and spokesperson since 2003.

See also
 Spain in the Eurovision Dance Contest – Dance version of the Eurovision Song Contest.
 Spain in the Eurovision Song Contest – Senior version of the Junior Eurovision Song Contest.
 Spain in the Eurovision Young Dancers – A competition organised by the EBU for younger dancers aged between 16 and 21.
 Spain in the Eurovision Young Musicians – A competition organised by the EBU for musicians aged 18 years and younger.

References

Countries in the Junior Eurovision Song Contest
Junior